The cruciate ligament of the atlas (cruciate may substitute for cruciform) is a ligament in the neck. It forms part of the atlanto-axial joint. The ligament is named after its cross shape. It consists of transverse and longitudinal components. The posterior longitudinal band may be absent in some people. The cruciate ligament of the atlas prevents abnormal movement of the atlanto-axial joint. It may be torn, such as by fractures of the atlas bone.

Structure 
The cruciate ligament of the atlas consists of the transverse ligament of the atlas, a superior longitudinal band, and an inferior longitudinal band. The superior longitudinal band connects the transverse ligament to the anterior side of the foramen magnum (near the basilar part) in the occipital bone of the skull. The inferior longitudinal band connects the transverse ligament to the body of the axis bone (C2).

Gerber's ligament runs deep to the superior band of the cruciate ligament of the atlas.

Variation 
The inferior longitudinal band may be absent in some people. The rest of the ligament is always present.

Function 
The cruciate ligament of the atlas prevents abnormal movements of the atlanto-axial joint. The longitudinal bands prevent hyperflexion and hyperextension of the occipital bone, and hold the transverse ligament of the atlas in a normal position.

Clinical significance 
Any part of the cruciate ligament of the atlas may tear, which is a significant injury. This may be caused by fractures of the atlas bone. Ligament tears may be imaged with radiography, a CT scan, or magnetic resonance imaging.

Ossification 
Very rarely, the cruciate ligament of the atlas may ossify. This may lead to cervical myelopathy, a deficit in the spinal cord.

Etymology 
The terms "cruciform" and "cruciate" refer to the cross shape of the ligament. Both terms are frequently used, although the term "cruciate" may be confusing due to confusion with the anterior cruciate ligament and the posterior cruciate ligament of the knee.

References 

Ligaments of the head and neck
Bones of the vertebral column